Aleksandar Atanacković (Cyrillic: Александар Aтaнaцкoвић; born November 29, 1980) is a Serbian footballer (midfielder) playing currently for Polish club Pogoń Lębork.

External links
 

1980 births
Living people
Footballers from Belgrade
Serbian footballers
Serbian expatriate footballers
FK Hajduk Kula players
Unia Janikowo players
Expatriate footballers in Poland
SV Wacker Burghausen players
Elana Toruń players
Chojniczanka Chojnice players
Wigry Suwałki players
Bałtyk Gdynia players
Expatriate footballers in Germany
Association football midfielders
Serbian expatriate sportspeople in Poland